Rod Grupen is a professor of Computer science and director of the Laboratory for Perceptual Robotics at the University of Massachusetts Amherst, Amherst.

Grupen's research integrates signal processing, control, dynamical systems, learning, and development as a means of constructing intelligent systems. He has published over 100 peer-reviewed journal, conference, and workshop papers. Grupen is the co-editor-in-chief of the Robotics and Autonomous Systems Journal and serves on the editorial board of the Journal of Artificial Intelligence for Engineering Design, Analysis and Manufacturing (AI EDAM). In 2010, Grupen received the Chancellor's Medal, the highest honor bestowed on individuals for exemplary and extraordinary service to the University of Massachusetts.

Grupen received both a B.S. in mechanical engineering from Washington University in St. Louis and a B.A. in physics from Franklin and Marshall College in 1980, an M.S. in mechanical engineering from Pennsylvania State University in 1984, and a Ph.D. in computer science from University of Utah in 1988. Grupen is most recently the author of the book "The Developmental Organization of Dexterous Robot Behavior" to be published by MIT Press in 2011.

References 

Year of birth missing (living people)
Living people
University of Massachusetts Amherst faculty
University of Utah alumni
American roboticists
American computer scientists
American mechanical engineers
McKelvey School of Engineering alumni